Joe Walsh's Greatest Hits – Little Did He Know... is a compilation released by guitarist Joe Walsh.  It contains his best-known solo songs as well as those he recorded with the James Gang and Barnstorm, but it does not contain material he released as a member of the Eagles. The remastered reissue of the compilation Joe Walsh: The Definitive Collection (2006) has the same cover art except for differing text above the photo and no text below the photo.

Critical reception
Writing for AllMusic, critic Stephen Thomas Erlewine wrote of the album "The double-disc Look What I Did! was simply too much for anyone but the dedicated Joe Walsh fan, which makes the release of the 15-song, single-disc Joe Walsh's Greatest Hits: Little Did He Know so welcome. Drawing highlights from his solo career and his early records with the James Gang, Greatest Hits contains almost every song that most fans would want".

Track listing
All songs written by Joe Walsh, except as noted.

Production
Compiled & Coordinated by: Joe Walsh, David Spero, Andy McKaie
Remastering: Bill Szymczyk
Photography: Tom Wright

References

1997 greatest hits albums
Joe Walsh albums